Hemet is a city in the San Jacinto Valley in Riverside County, California. The population was 89,833 at the 2020 census.

The founding of Hemet, initially called South San Jacinto,  predates the formation of Riverside County. This area was then still part of San Diego County. The formation of Lake Hemet helped the city to grow and stimulated agriculture in the area. 

The city is known for being the home of The Ramona Pageant, California's official outdoor play set in the Spanish colonial era. Started in 1923, the play is one of the longest-running outdoor plays in the United States. 

Hemet has been named a Tree City USA for 20 years by the Arbor Day Foundation for its dedication to the local forest. The city is home to the Hemet Valley Medical Center, a 320-bed general hospital.

History

This had long been the territory of the indigenous Soboba people and Cahuilla tribe prior to Spanish colonization. During the early 19th century, Mission San Luis Rey used the land for cattle ranching. They named the area with the settler name Rancho San Jacinto.

Etymology

Hemet was named by the land development company that founded the town, The Lake Hemet Land Company. The company drew its name from Hemet Valley, now called Garner Valley, located in the San Jacinto Mountains. Initially the company referred to the area as South San Jacinto, but changed the name to Hemet when the land company filed a plat map on November 11, 1893.

Mexican period

Following Mexico gaining independence from Spain, in 1842, settler José Antonio Estudillo received the Rancho San Jacinto Viejo Mexican land grant.

In 1848 the United States annexed the California territory after defeating Mexico in the Mexican–American War. In 1887, during the first major Southern California land boom, Anglo-Americans W.F. Whittier and E.L. Mayberry founded the Lake Hemet Water Company, and the Lake Hemet Land Company, for speculative development. They had plans to dam the San Jacinto River to provide irrigation water to the valley. They named the town Hemet in November 1893. 

In 1895, they completed Hemet Dam as a private project on the San Jacinto River, creating Lake Hemet and providing a reliable water supply to the San Jacinto Valley. This water system, for irrigation in an arid region, was integral to the valley's development as an agricultural area.

By 1894, settlers had established a newspaper, the Hemet News, and "several general stores", the largest being Heffelfinger & Co, which occupied an entire block. Other businesses included "a drug store, an excellent barber shop, two blacksmith shops, harness shop, shoe repairing houses, two real estate offices and two lumber yards." "The most pretentious building" was the two-story Hotel Mayberry, "supplied with all the modern conveniences usually found in first-class hostelries, including stationary water, baths, etc., and a complete electric light system, the power for which is furnished by the company's private plant." Also noted was the Hemet flour mill, owned by John McCool and built at a cost of $20,000. It was the only such mill in this area, and was housed in a brick building. It could produce 50 barrels of flour per day.

Incorporation

Hemet was incorporated in January 1910. Of 177 residents, 130 voted to incorporate, with 33 against. Those who voted against incorporation were landowners who feared increased taxation. The incorporation helped to serve the growing city, which was outgrowing its current infrastructure. 

With a railroad spur running from Riverside, the city became a trading center for San Jacinto Valley agriculture; commodity crops included citrus, apricots, peaches, olives, and walnuts. The Agricultural District Farmer's Fair of Riverside County began here in 1936 as the Hemet Turkey Show. It was relocated to Perris. 

During World War II, the city hosted the Ryan School of Aeronautics, which trained about 6,000 fliers for the Army Air Force between 1940 and 1944. The site of the flight school was redeveloped as Hemet-Ryan Airport. In 1950, Hemet was home to 10,000 people, joining Corona and Riverside as the three largest cities in Riverside County.

Hemet was racially discriminatory. Numerous African Americans migrated to California during and after World War II in the Great Migration from such Deep South states as Mississippi, Louisiana, and Texas. Hemet was a sundown town, prohibiting African Americans from living there or even staying overnight.

In the 1960s, large-scale residential development began, mostly in the form of mobile home parks and retirement communities. Hemet was known as a working-class retirement area. In the 1980s, former ranchland was developed in subdivisions of single-family homes. "Big-box" retail followed the increase in population. After a roughly decade-long lull in development following the major economic downturn of the early 1990s, housing starts in the city skyrocketed in the early 21st century. The area's affordability, its proximity to employment centers such as Corona, Riverside and San Bernardino, and its relatively rural character made it an attractive location for working-class families priced out of other areas of Southern California.

Timeline
From the Hemet Library Heritage Room History Collection:
 1850: California becomes state
 1858: Hemet established as a farm settlement
 1887: Lake Hemet Water Company & Hemet Land Company formed
 1888: Rail service from Perris to the San Jacinto Valley
 1892: US Post office established
 1893: Riverside County formed from parts of San Diego & San Bernardino counties
 1893: First elementary school built on North Alessandro Street
 1894: First high school built at Buena Vista and Acacia
 1895: Lake Hemet Dam completed
 1899: Earthquake (estimated magnitude ~6.5) destroyed most brick buildings in downtown
 1910: City of Hemet incorporated
 1914: Santa Fe depot opened at present site
 1918: The 6.7 Mw San Jacinto earthquake caused significant structural damage and ground failure.
 1921: Opening of the Hemet Theater
 1923: First performance of the Ramona Pageant
 1940: Ryan School of Aeronautics opened
 1943: Hemet Community Hospital opened
 1950: Eastern Municipal Water District created
 1959: Hemet Police Department built
 1966: Hemet Unified School District formed from several existing districts
 1970: More than 10,000 residents for the first time
 1971: Paradise Valley Ranch served as an infirmary for contained outbreak of Mad Cow Disease. 
 1972: New Hemet high school opened
 1974: Kushimoto, Japan became first sister city.
 1980: Hemet Valley Mall opened on W Florida Ave between N Kirby St & N Gilmore St
 1983: Ebeltoft, Denmark became second sister city.
 1987: Depot abandoned by Santa Fe railroad—offered to sell to City of Hemet
 1987: Bácum, Mexico became third sister city
 1988: Save Our Station (S.O.S.) purchased Santa Fe Depot for renovation and preservation
 1989: Marumori, Japan became fourth sister city.
 1991: Domenigoni and Diamond Valleys named sites for M.W.D. reservoir
 1995: Metropolitan Water District started 800,000 ac·ft reservoir
 1996: Domenigoni Parkway opened
 1998: Hemet Museum opened in Santa Fe depot
 1999: M.W.D. Diamond Valley Lake completed
 2000: Diamond Valley Lake dedicated
 2003: Public library moved to East Latham Avenue
 2010: Centennial as an incorporated city

Geography
Hemet is in the San Jacinto Valley of western Riverside County, south of San Jacinto. The valley, surrounded by the Santa Rosa Hills and San Jacinto Mountains, is mostly dry land, except for Diamond Valley Lake to the south. Hemet is located at  (33.742001, −116.983068).

Climate
Hemet has a semi-arid climate (Köppen climate classification: BSh) with mild winters and very hot, very dry summers.

Demographics

2010
The 2010 United States Census reported that Hemet had a population of 78,657. The racial makeup of Hemet was 53,259 (67.7%) White (51.8% Non-Hispanic White), 5,049 (6.4%) African American, 1,223 (1.6%) Native American, 2,352 (3.0%) Asian, 284 (0.4%) Pacific Islander, 12,371 (15.7%) from other races, and 4,119 (5.2%) from two or more races. Hispanic or Latino of any race were 28,150 persons (35.8%).

The census reported that 78,043 people (99.2% of the population) lived in households, 155 (0.2%) lived in non-institutionalized group quarters, and 459 (0.6%) were institutionalized.

There were 30,092 households, out of which 9,700 (32.2%) had children under the age of 18 living in them, 13,174 (43.8%) were opposite-sex married couples living together, 4,349 (14.5%) had a female householder with no husband present, 1,623 (5.4%) had a male householder with no wife present. There were 2,002 (6.7%) unmarried opposite-sex partnerships, and 208 (0.7%) same-sex married couples or partnerships. 9,119 households (30.3%) were made up of individuals, and 5,754 (19.1%) had someone living alone who was 65 years of age or older. The average household size was 2.59. There were 19,146 families (63.6% of all households); the average family size was 3.24.

The population was spread out, with 20,340 people (25.9%) under the age of 18, 6,814 people (8.7%) aged 18 to 24, 17,323 people (22.0%) aged 25 to 44, 16,776 people (21.3%) aged 45 to 64, and 17,404 people (22.1%) who were 65 years of age or older. The median age was 39.0 years. For every 100 females, there were 88.9 males. For every 100 females age 18 and over, there were 84.3 males.

The homeowner vacancy rate was 5.0%; the rental vacancy rate was 17.5%. 45,459 people (57.8% of the population) lived in owner-occupied housing units and 32,584 people (41.4%) lived in rental housing units.

During 20092013, Hemet had a median household income of $32,774, with 23.3% of the population living below the federal poverty line.

2008
, the census estimated there were 75,163 people, over 29,341 households, and 18,031 families residing in the city. , The racial makeup of the city was 60% white, 2.4% black or African American, 4.9% Asian or Pacific Islander, 4.9% from other races and 28.2% of the population were Hispanic or Latino. 12.6% were of German, 10.5% English, 7.8% Irish and 4.3% American ancestry.

There were 29,341 households, out of which 31.1% had children under the age of 18 living with them, 43.6% were married couples living together, 13.5% had a female householder with no husband present, and 38.5% were non-families. 33.4% of all households were made up of individuals, and 21.7% had someone living alone who was 65 years of age or older. The average household size was 2.5 and the average family size was 3.2.

In the city, the population was spread out, with 29.1% under the age of 19, 6.2% from 20 to 24, 11.9% from 25 to 34, 10.6% from 35 to 44, 17.2% from 45 to 54, and 25.7% who were 65 or older. The median age was 38 years.

The median income for a household in the city was $34,974, and the median income for a family was $41,559. Males had a median income of $40,719 versus $30,816 for females. The per capita income for the city was $19,046.  About 14.5% of families and 17.2% of the population were below the poverty line, including 24.5% of those under age 18 and 9.1% of those age 65 or over. , about 22,300 residents of the city were employed with 4,700 unemployed (an unemployment rate of 17.4%).

Economy
According to the California Economic Development Department, in 2005 the economy of Hemet was based on four main industries: retail trade, health care, educational services, and government. These industries provide 4,734, 4,441, and 3,946 jobs respectively. Other major industries in the city include leisure and hospitality, financial services, professional and business services, construction, and manufacturing. The amount of wage and salary positions in Hemet is 22,769, with a further 1,479 people being self-employed, adding up to a total of 24,248 jobs in the city.

Top employers
According to the City of Hemet's 2021 Annual Comprehensive Financial Report, the ten largest employers in the city are:

Hemet was heavily impacted by the housing crisis which followed the financial crisis of 2007–2008. Rent remains affordable, but the three-hour commute by Metrolink to Union Station in downtown Los Angeles has impeded Hemet's growth as a bedroom community.

Arts and culture

The City of Hemet has two museums and an outdoor amphitheater. The Hemet Museum is located at the intersection of State Street and Florida Avenue in downtown. It is a museum of local history, and features photographs of old Hemet, historic photographs from the Ramona Pageant, as well as Cahuilla cultural belongings such as baskets and agriculture displays. Hemet is also home of the Western Science Center, located in the southern part of the city at the intersection of Domenigoni Parkway and Searl Parkway. It features exhibits of Ice Age mammals, including 'Max', the largest mastodon found in the Western United States, and as 'Xena', a Columbian mammoth. Along with the two museums, science center and theater, close to Hemet there sits an outdoor amphitheater, the privately owned Ramona Bowl is a natural amphitheater located nearby in the Riverside county foothills. It is known for producing the play, Ramona.

Entertainment
The city of Hemet is expanding upon its entertainment venues. The three largest venues are the Ramona Bowl, an outdoor amphitheater, a Regal Cinemas and the Historic Hemet Theatre, built in 1921. A development being planned for the area is a downtown transit village, with the center of it being a Metrolink station. It will be north of the downtown core, and will consist of residences, shops, and parks. The station itself could feature a railroad museum, a heritage trail, and a farmer's market and market hall.

The Historic Hemet Theater was once the oldest continually run single-screen theater in the nation. However, the theater was forced to close down in January 2010 due to water damage from a fire that destroyed adjacent store fronts. The musty smell forced the theater to stay closed for a year, which created financial struggles. , the foundation was incorporated as a non-profit 501(c)3 for the purpose of supporting community projects. In July 2013, the Historic Hemet Theater Foundation negotiated a five-year lease/option to purchase the theater. Since then, the Foundation has restored the Theater back to operation and is in the process of raising funds in order to purchase and restore the Hemet Historical Treasure.

Parks and recreation
In addition to Diamond Valley Lake, Hemet has six large parks throughout the city.

Weston Park
Weston Park was established in 1921 and was dedicated to John B. Weston, who was president of the board of trustees from 1914 to 1920. It contains shuffleboard courts, restrooms, playground, basketball court, and turf area for passive uses and games.

Simpson Park
Dedicated to James Simpson, Hemet City Council 1947–48, and mayor 1950 to 1966. Simpson Park is a wilderness park located in the Santa Rosa Hills southeast of Hemet with sheltered picnic area and tables, barbecues, restrooms, and hiking trails.

Mary Henley Park
Dedicated to Mary Henley, born in Hemet and served as Hemet City Clerk from October 1951 to March 1975, and is the first Hemet Park named after a real person. The park contains two playground areas, half basketball court, picnic tables, shade structures, restrooms and a large turf area. There is a marked walking path/sidewalk of  around the perimeter of the park. A fitness court was opened in October 2022.

Gibbel Park
Gibbel Park contains a large children's play area, ball field, a half basketball court, restrooms, two lighted tennis courts, a lawn bowling green, horseshoe pits, picnic areas, and a large turf area for passive uses. The park also features a memorial of military branches of the United States.

Valley Wide Community Sports Park 
The Valley Wide Community Sports Park opened in September 2009. The park, part of the eastern recreation area of Diamond Valley Lake, hosts eight baseball fields, eight lighted baseball fields, eight soccer fields, four basketball courts, six tennis courts, seven volleyball courts, two pickleball courts, fitness trails, three play areas, four restrooms, and three picnic areas. The park is also adjacent to an aquatic center.

Brubaker Park
Brubaker park contains one large children's play area, one half basketball court, eleven baseball/softball fields, fitness trails, two picnic areas, and one portable restroom.

Education
The city's educational services are under the Hemet Unified School District to cover all of Hemet, and parts of San Jacinto and Valle Vista, with a student population of over 20,000 students. There are also HUSD member schools in the rural communities of Anza, Idyllwild and Winchester.

As of January 2010, the school district was facing having to possibly go far out of budget to fix the Historic Hemet Elementary school, due to the fact that it was built on top of a swamp and has been sinking deeper every year. The main building was built in 1927, and is one of the few historic landmarks left in Hemet. The other choice would be to demolish the school and build a new one in its place. The State of California will pay for 50% of either project, but the already cash-strapped district may run into trouble if the repairing of the school goes over budget. A new building could cost $20 million, with an extra $3 million to have it built in the original architectural style of the old building.

High schools
Hemet High School, Western Center Academy, West Valley High School and Tahquitz High School in Hemet and Hamilton High School in Anza.

Middle schools
Acacia Middle School, Diamond Valley Middle School, Dartmouth Middle School, Western Center Academy, and Rancho Viejo Middle School.

Elementary schools
Bautista Creek Elementary, Cawston Elementary, Fruitvale Elementary, Harmony Elementary, Hemet Elementary, Jacob Wiens Elementary, Little Lake Elementary, McSweeny Elementary, Ramona Elementary, Valle Vista Elementary, Whittier Elementary and Winchester Elementary.

All grade
Cottonwood School of Aguanga & Hamilton School of Anza.

Alternative schools
Advanced Path Studies School (credit recovery), Alessandro High School – continuation (grades 10–12), Baypoint Preparatory Academy (grades K-12), Family Tree Learning Center (grades K–8), Helen Hunt Jackson School for independent studies, Hemet Academy of Applied Academics and Technology (grades 9–12), Hemecinto Alternative Educational Center (grades 6–9), Western Center Academy (grades 6–12), River Springs Charter School (grades TK-5), and Renaissance Valley Academy (grades 6-12). The school is part of/owned by the Springs Charter School system, but operated elsewhere.

Dwelling Place Learning Academy (DPLA) is a Private Christian Academy. DPLA is K–5th grade with a student-to-teacher ratio of 16-to-1; their curriculum is based in the Weaver Curriculum (Unit Study). DPLA will add at least one grade a year until the 12th grade to become a K-12 school. DPLA began on August 17, 2015, and was incorporated as a 501(C)(3) in the State of California.

St. Johns Christian School has been a private Christian school since 1983, offering classes for children between 18 months and the 8th grade. St. Johns School was ranked the #1 Preschool in the 23rd Annual Press-Enterprise Best of Inland Empire Readers’ Choice Awards.

Media

Former
The Hemet News was a newspaper published from about 1894 until 1999.

Current
Hemet and nearby San Jacinto are situated in the Los Angeles designated market area and are able to receive most of the Los Angeles and Riverside/San Bernardino area television stations via cable and satellite providers. Over the air signals with limited reception include KCAL-TV 9 (Independent) Los Angeles; KVCR-TV 24 (PBS) San Bernardino; KFMB-TV 8 (CBS), KUSI 9 (Independent) and KNSD 39 (NBC) from San Diego; two ABC stations KABC 7 L.A. and KESQ-TV 42 from Palm Springs; KOCE 50 (PBS) and KVEA 52 (Telemundo) from Orange County, California. A local TV station based in Hemet and nearby Perris is KZSW 27 (Independent) of Temecula.

Infrastructure

Air
Commercial air service is provided by the Palm Springs International Airport and Ontario International Airport. Hemet-Ryan Airport, which is a municipal airport owned by Riverside County, is located in the city but has no commercial service.

Transportation
Public transit in Hemet is provided by the RTA, which has stops at various locations including Florida Avenue and Lincoln Avenue, and the Hemet Valley Mall. Routes in the Hemet area include: 28, 31, 32, 33, 42, 74, 79, 217.

Expansion of the Metrolink commuter rail service from Perris to Hemet has been discussed, with stations planned for West Hemet and Downtown Hemet.

Highways and streets
Two California State Highways cross the city. California State Route 74 runs along most of Florida Avenue, the main corridor of east and west transportation in Hemet, and California State Route 79 also follows Florida Avenue for a few miles in the city. Highway 79 is slated for re-alignment when the Mid County Parkway project begins. Streets in Hemet are arranged mostly in a standard grid. Almost all major streets that go east–west are avenues, and almost all streets going north–south are streets. Exceptions are Sanderson Avenue, Lyon Avenue, Palm Avenue and Cawston Avenue. Major streets in Hemet are Florida Avenue, Sanderson Avenue, San Jacinto Street, Stetson Avenue, and State Street.

Railroad
The railroad to Hemet was operated by AT&SF Railway from 1888 to 1987. It was used for loading and shipping oranges that grew in the region. In 1987, it was abandoned because of a lack of demand for transportation. Today the railroad line is mostly abandoned. Tracks are usually used for storing rail cars for a short time while they are not needed by Class I railroads.

Library

The City of Hemet public library was created in 1906. Members of the Women's Club opened a reading room at the corner of Harvard Street and Florida Avenue.

In 1910, citizens of the newly formed city voted for its own library, and the city took over the operation of the facility built in 1906. Shortly after, the reading room became too small for the growing community, and groups and citizens lobbied for a newer, larger facility to house the growing collection of books. A woman of the community named Mrs. E.A. Davis was the one who wrote to Andrew Carnegie seeking funds to help build a new library. The city received $7,500 to fund part of the construction, and Mr. and Mrs. St. John donated land to the city to build the new Carnegie Library. The new library was finished in 1913, and served the city for 52 years. The building was declared unsafe by the Fire Marshall and razed in 1969, and the new C.B. Covell Memorial Library was built. This building however, also became too small for the city.

The library moved again in 2003, to its current facility, relocated for the first time since 1913. The new facility is now located at 300 E. Latham Avenue, just blocks from its former location. The new building is two stories tall, and contains . It was designed by John Loomis of 30th Street Architects at a cost of over $15 million.

Notable people 
 Carl Barks, writer and artist, 1942–1969
Roland Bautista, guitarist
 John E. King and Homer D. King, father-and-son publishers of the Hemet News between 1912 and 1961
 James Lafferty, actor
 Henning Dahl Mikkelsen, cartoonist
 David Miscavige, Church of Scientology leader. 
 Bill Murray, actor
Mickey Rooney, Jr., actor and musician
Brendan Steele, professional golfer
 L.E. Timberlake, Los Angeles City Council member, 1945–69

Sister cities 
Hemet has five sister cities: 
 Kushimoto (Japan)
 Bácum (Mexico)
 Ebeltoft (Denmark)
 Marumori (Japan)
 Cootamundra, (Australia)

See also

Largest cities in Southern California
List of largest California cities by population
List of Mexican-American communities

References

External links

 Official website
 Hemet Museum
 SanJacintoValley.info Information for residents and visitors of Hemet and San Jacinto located in San Jacinto Valley, California.
 Official Library website

 
Cities in Riverside County, California
Incorporated cities and towns in California
Populated places established in 1887
1887 establishments in California
Sundown towns in California